The ninth season of The Fairly OddParents premiered on March 23, 2013 with the episode "Fairly OddPet" which aired after the 2013 Nickelodeon Kids' Choice Awards. Nickelodeon renewed the  show for a ninth season on March 14, 2012, during its upfront. The season ended on March 28, 2015 with the episode "The Fairy Beginning".

Production
The season was produced by Billionfold Inc., Frederator Studios, and Nickelodeon Animation Studio. This season features episodes 127-152, and Timmy Turner gets a fairy dog named Sparky. Recording for the ninth season began in June 2012 and ended in March 2013. This is the longest season with the most episodes. It is the second season to air after a year-long hiatus, after the 2006 cancellation. It is also the first season produced fully for high definition and widescreen presentation.

Episodes

Notes

References

The Fairly OddParents seasons
2013 American television seasons
2014 American television seasons
2015 American television seasons